Grankulla IFK, or GrIFK as the name is commonly abbreviated, is a Finnish sports club from the city of Kauniainen.  The club was formed in 1925 and the main activities covered are football, ice-hockey, handball, floorball and alpine. The club's main handball team...  The club's main ice-hockey team is...  Handball...  Alpine... The club's main football team is currently playing in the Kakkonen, the third tier of the Finnish football league system. GrIFK play their home matches at Kauniaisten Keskuskenttä. The Chairman of the football club is Matti Hannuksela.  The club has more than 700 registered players.

History

GrIFK Football has played 13 seasons in the Ykkönen (First Division), the second tier of Finnish football in 1978–80, 1982–85, 1987–88, 1990, 2008 and 2016-2017.  They also have had ten spells (covering 21 seasons) in the third tier, the Kakkonen (the Second Division), in 1973–75, 1977, 1981, 1986, 1989, 1991–92, 1996, 2005–07, 2009-2015 and 2018 to the present day.

Season to season

Club structure

GRIFK run a number of teams including 3 men's teams, 1 veteran's team, close to 20 boys teams (including A and B juniors on 2nd highest level (Ykkönen) in Finland) and 4 girls teams.

2020 season

 GrIFK  are competing in Group B (Lohko B) of the Kakkonen administered by the Football Association of Finland  (Suomen Palloliitto) .  This is the third highest tier in the Finnish football system.  In 2019 GrIFK finished in ninth position in their Kakkonen section.

Current squad 2020 (updating in process)

Sources
 Suomen Cup

References

External links
 Official Football Website
  GrIFK Jalkapallo / Fotboll Facebook

Football clubs in Finland
Sport in Kauniainen
1925 establishments in Finland
Sports clubs established in 1925
Multi-sport clubs in Finland